Jeevan Jyot Kaur is an Indian politician and the MLA from Amritsar East Assembly constituency. She is a member of the Aam Aadmi Party. She defeated Navjot Singh Sidhu in the 2022 Punjab Legislative Assembly election.

Political career
In 2022, Jyot contested from Aam Aadmi Party and won Punjab Legislative Assembly election from Amritsar East Assembly constituency. She defeated the incumbent MLA Navjot Singh Sidhu of Indian National Congress and Bikram Singh Majithia of Shiromani Akali Dal. She received 36.74% of the votes and won with a margin of 6.25% from the runner up Navjot Singh Sidhu. The Aam Aadmi Party gained a strong 79% majority in the sixteenth Punjab Legislative Assembly by winning 92 out of 117 seats in the 2022 Punjab Legislative Assembly election. MP Bhagwant Mann was sworn in as Chief Minister on 16 March 2022.

Member (2022–23) Committee on Public Accounts 
Member (2022–23) Committee on Local Bodies

Electoral performance

References

Living people
Punjab, India MLAs 2022–2027
Aam Aadmi Party politicians from Punjab, India
Year of birth missing (living people)
People from Punjab, India